Eswatini first participated at the Olympic Games in 1972 (as Swaziland). They missed the next two games but returned for the 1984 Olympics in Los Angeles and have appeared in all the games since then. They made their first and only appearance at the Winter Olympics in 1992. In all competitions they have yet to win a medal.

Eswatini has been represented by the Eswatini Olympic and Commonwealth Games Association (formerly the Swaziland Olympic and Commonwealth Games Association) since 1972.

Medal tables

Medals in Summer Games

Medals in Winter Games

See also
 List of flag bearers for Eswatini at the Olympics
 List of participating nations at the Summer Olympic Games
 List of participating nations at the Winter Olympic Games

External links